The 1913 Kerry Senior Football Championship was the 21st staging of the Kerry Senior Football Championship since its establishment by the Kerry County Board in 1889.

Dr. Crokes entered the championship as the defending champions. 

The final was played on 18 January 1914, between Dr. Crokes and Kilcummin, in what was their first ever meeting in the final. Dr. Crokes won the match by 3-01 to 1-00 to claim their third championship title overall and a second title in succession.

Results

Final

Championship statistics

Miscellaneous
 Kilcummin qualify for the final for the first time since 1903.

References

Kerry Senior Football Championship
1913 in Gaelic football